The Tebra is a river in the South Kurzeme Municipality of Latvia, in the region of Courland.

It originates from Podnieki Lake Kalvene Parish. Most of the river flow is in the hills of western Latvia (Bandavas Hills and Apricot Plain). In the middle of the river there is a pronounced valley, which reaches depth of 10–20 m and has many ponds. A water reservoir (mill pond) Aizpute. The main tributaries are the rivers Aloxte (right) and Grabstes (left). Near settlement Saka river merges with Durbe, forming the Saka River.

On the shores of the Tebra river there are several large populated areas: Aizpute, Štakeldanga, Apriki. River is crossed by a motorway P112.

References

Rivers of Latvia
South Kurzeme Municipality
Courland